Euscorpius is a genus of scorpions, commonly called small wood-scorpions. It presently contains 65 species and is the type genus of the family Euscorpiidae – long included in the Chactidae – and the subfamily Euscorpiinae.

The most common members belong to the E. carpathicus species complex, which makes up the subgenus Euscorpius. This group is widespread from North Africa and Spain to temperate Eurasia from England and northern France through the Czech Republic to Russia.

The species range in colour from yellow-brown to dark brown. Many are brown with yellow legs and stinger. The largest is E. italicus at 5 cm (2 in), and the smallest is E. germanus at 1.5 cm (0.6 in). The venom of Euscorpius species is generally very weak, with effects similar to a mosquito bite. Some smaller specimens may not even be able to puncture the human skin with their stings.

Species
Euscorpius contains the following sixty-five species:

 Euscorpius aladaglarensis Tropea & Yagmur, 2016
 Euscorpius alanyaensis Tropea, Yagmur, Parmakelis & Kunt, 2016
 Euscorpius altadonnai Tropea, 2017
 Euscorpius amorgensis Tropea, Fet, Parmakelis, Kotsakiozi & Stathi, 2017
 Euscorpius aquilejensis (C. L. Koch, 1837)
 Euscorpius arikani Yagmur & Tropea, 2015
 Euscorpius avcii Tropea, Yagmur, Koc, Yesilyurt & Rossi 2012
 Euscorpius balearicus Caporiacco, 1950
 Euscorpius biokovensis Tropea & Ozimec, 2020
 Euscorpius birulai Fet, Soleglad, Parmakelis, Kotsakiozi & Stathi, 2014
 Euscorpius bonacinai Kovarik & Stahlavsky, 2020
 Euscorpius borovaglavaensis Tropea, 2015
 Euscorpius calabriae Di Caporiacco, 1950
 Euscorpius candiota Birula, 1903
 Euscorpius canestrinii (Fanzago, 1872)
 Euscorpius carpathicus (Linnaeus, 1767)
 Euscorpius celanus Tropea, 2012
 Euscorpius ciliciensis Birula, 1898
 Euscorpius concinnus (C. L. Koch, 1837)
 Euscorpius corcyraeus Tropea & Rossi, 2012
 Euscorpius curcici Tropea, Fet, Parmakelis, Kotsakiozi & Stathi, 2017
 Euscorpius deltshevi Fet, Graham, Webber & Blagoev, 2014
 Euscorpius drenskii Tropea, Fet, Parmakelis, Kotsakiozi & Stathi, 2015
 Euscorpius erymanthius Tropea, Fet, Parmakelis, Kotsakiozi & Stathi, 2013
 Euscorpius eskisehirensis Tropea & Yagmur, 2015
 Euscorpius feti Tropea, 2013
 Euscorpius garganicus Caporiacco, 1950
 Euscorpius giachinoi Tropea & Fet, 2015
 Euscorpius gocmeni Tropea, Yagmur & Yesilyurt, 2014
 Euscorpius hadzii Caporiacco, 1950
 Euscorpius hakani Tropea & Yagmur, 2016
 Euscorpius honazicus Tropea, Yagmur, Karampatsou, Parmakelis & Yesilyurt, 2016
 Euscorpius hyblaeus Tropea, 2016
 Euscorpius idaeus Yagmur & Tropea, 2017
 Euscorpius italicus (Herbst, 1800)
 Euscorpius janstai Kovarik & Stahlavsky, 2020
 Euscorpius kabateki Kovarik & Stahlavsky, 2020
 Euscorpius kinzelbachi Tropea, Fet, Parmakelis, Kotsakiozi & Stathi, 2014
 Euscorpius koci Tropea & Yagmur, 2015
 Euscorpius koschewnikowi Birula, 1900
 Euscorpius kritscheri Fet, Soleglad, Parmakelis, Kotsakiozi & Stathi, 2013
 Euscorpius lagostae Caporiacco, 1950
 Euscorpius lesbiacus Tropea, Fet, Parmakelis, Kotsakiozi, Stathi & Zafeiriou, 2020
 Euscorpius lycius Yagmur, Tropea & Yesilyurt, 2013
 Euscorpius mylonasi Fet, Soleglad, Parmakelis, Kotsakiozi & Stathi, 2014
 Euscorpius naupliensis (C. L. Koch, 1837)
 Euscorpius oglasae Di Caporiacco, 1950
 Euscorpius ossae Di Capriacco, 1950
 Euscorpius parthenopeius Tropea, Parmakelis, Sziszkosz, Balanika & Bouderka, 2014
 Euscorpius popovi Tropea, Fet, Parmakelis, Kotsakiozi & Stathi, 2015
 Euscorpius sadileki Kovarik & Stahlavsky, 2020
 Euscorpius salentinus Tropea, 2017
 Euscorpius scaber Birula, 1900
 Euscorpius scheraboni Kovarik & Stahlavsky, 2020
 Euscorpius sicanus (C. L. Koch, 1837)
 Euscorpius solegladi Fet, Graham, Webber & Blagoev, 2014
 Euscorpius stahlavskyi Tropea, Fet, Parmakelis, Kotsakiozi & Stathi, 2014
 Euscorpius studentium Karaman, 2020
 Euscorpius sultanensis Tropea & Yagmur, 2016
 Euscorpius tauricus (C. L. Koch, 1837)
 Euscorpius tergestinus (C.L. Koch, 1837)
 Euscorpius thracicus Kovarik, Lowe, Byronova & Stahlavsky, 2020
 Euscorpius vailatii Tropea & Fet, 2015
 Euscorpius vignai Tropea, Fet, Parmakelis, Kotsakiozi & Stathi, 2014
 Euscorpius yagmuri Kovarik, Fet & Soleglad, 2014

References

Euscorpiidae
Scorpion genera
Scorpions of Africa
Scorpions of Asia
Scorpions of Europe
Taxa named by Tamerlan Thorell